A Girl of London is a 1925 British silent drama film directed by Henry Edwards and starring Genevieve Townsend, Ian Hunter and Nora Swinburne. Its plot concerns the son of a member of parliament, who is disowned by his father when he marries a girl who works in a factory. Meanwhile, he tries to rescue his new wife from her stepfather who operates a drugs den. It was based on a novel by Douglas Walshe.

Cast
 Genevieve Townsend as Lil
 Ian Hunter as Peter Horniman
 Harvey Braban as George Durran
 G. H. Mulcaster as Wilson
 Nora Swinburne as Vee-Vee
 Edward Irwin as Lionel Horniman
 Bernard Dudley as Lawton
 Nell Emerald as Mother

References

Bibliography
 Low, Rachael. The History of British Film, Volume 4 1918–1929. Routledge, 1997.

External links
 

1925 films
1925 drama films
British silent feature films
Films set in London
Films directed by Henry Edwards
British drama films
British black-and-white films
Stoll Pictures films
Films shot at Cricklewood Studios
1920s English-language films
1920s British films
Silent drama films